Dom people or "Ghagar" migrated during the Roman era to the territory of the present day Egypt from South Asia, particularly from Indian Subcontinent, and heavily intermixed with Egyptians. Scholars suggest that their Egyptian admixture later made them known around the world by the short term Gypsy, a short for Egyptian. Though some of the Dom people self-segregated themselves for centuries from the dominant culture of Egypt, historically; Domari in Egypt have intermixed with Egyptians and participated at local musical entertainment at weddings, boy islamic circumcision and other celebrations, singing Egyptian traditional songs and dance in return for money. The Dom people in Egypt or Roma Egyptians include subgroups like Nawar, and Ghagar (ghaggar).
The Dom in Egypt are Sunni Muslims and speak Egyptian Arabic also their own Domari language together.

Ottoman sources
Evliya Çelebi's Seyahatname of 1668, he explained that the Gypsy's from Komotini (Gümülcine) swear by their heads, their ancestors came from Egypt. Also the sedentary Gypsys groups from Serres region in Greece, believe their ancestors were once taken from Egypt Eyalet by the Ottomans after 1517 to Rumelia, to work on the tobacco plantations of Turkish feudals there. Muslim Roma settled in Baranya and the City Pécs at the Ottoman Hungary. After the Siege of Pécs when Habsburg take it back, Muslim Roma and some other Muslims convert to the Catholic faith in the years 1686 -1713. The Ghagar a subgroup of the Doms in Egypt, tell that some of them went to Hungary.

See also
Doms in Libya
Doms in Syria
Doms in Iraq
Nawar people

References

External links
The Gypsies of Egypt, Dom Research Center

Ethnic groups in Egypt
Dom in Africa
Dom people